The Military Commendation Medal is a military decoration presented to members of the Armed Forces of the Philippines.  It is presented for exemplary execution of military duty.

Description
The medal is a three-pointed star, made of bronze colored metal, pointing upward.  In the center of the three-pointed star is a small five-pointed star.  Starting below the three-pointed star is a golden wreath, wrapping all the way to the top of the medal, passing under and visible between the arms of the star.

The medal is suspended from a green ribbon with three wide white central stripes.

See also
 Awards and decorations of the Armed Forces of the Philippines

References

Citations

Bibliography
 The AFP Adjutant General, AFP Awards and Decorations Handbook, 1995, 1997, OTAG.

Military awards and decorations of the Philippines